Roger Ross Williams (born September 16, 1962) is an American director, producer and writer and the first African American director to win an Academy Award (Oscar), with his short film Music by Prudence; this film won the Academy Award for Best Documentary Short Film in 2009.

Life and career 
Williams is a member of a Gullah family from South Carolina, and has lived and worked in New York City for over twenty-five years. Williams attended Northampton Community College in Bethlehem, Pennsylvania and New York University in New York City.

Williams began his career in 1985, producing political satire for Comedy Central and Michael Moore's Emmy Award-winning series TV Nation. He has since produced and directed for NBC News, MSNBC, BBC, CNN and has produced work for Comedy Central, Food Network, TLC, VH1, including numerous primetime specials for Public Broadcasting Service (PBS), American Broadcasting Company (ABC) and ABC News, CBS, Sundance Channel and New York Times Television. He has also produced a documentary series for Discovery Networks and a lifestyle series, Sheila Bridges Designer Living, for Scripps Networks. He has won numerous awards for his TV work including a NAMIC Vision Award and the National Headliner for Best Human Interest Feature documentary.

Williams has directed a number of films including Life, Animated, which won the Sundance Film Festival Directing Award, was nominated for an Academy Award for Best Documentary Feature Film and won three Emmy Awards in 2018, including the award for Best Documentary. The film God Loves Uganda that he directed, which was shortlisted for an Academy Award for Best Documentary Feature Film and American Jail, examined the U.S. prison system and premiered on CNN and the BBC. Williams directed Traveling While Black, a virtual reality documentary / transmedia project made for Facebook's Oculus, which premiered at the Sundance Film Festival in 2019. His 2019 film The Apollo, a documentary about Harlem's legendary Apollo Theater, was the opening night film of the 2019 Tribeca Film Festival.

His first narrative feature film for Amazon Studios is in pre-production. His production company, One Story Up, which he founded with Geoff Martz, is producing a variety of projects including documentary series for Netflix.

The documentary film Master of Light, directed by Rosa Ruth Boesten and produced by Geoff Martz, Ilja Roomans, Anousha Nzume and Williams, was played at the music and film festival South by Southwest (SXSW) in March 2022. It is a production of One Story Up and the Dutch documentary collective 'Docmakers'. It is a film about the artist George Anthony Morton. The film was included in HBO Max that same year.

Williams is the first African American director to win an Academy Award (Oscar) with his short film Music by Prudence; this film won the Academy Award for Best Documentary Short Film in 2009. 

Williams serves on the board of Docubox Kenya, a documentary fund and mentorship program based in Nairobi that supports African filmmakers. Williams serves on the alumni advisor board of None On Record, the alumni advisory board of the Sundance Institute, and, since 2016, the Board of Governors for the Academy of Motion Pictures Arts and Sciences, serving as chair of the Documentary Branch and the Documentary Diversity Committee He is also 
a trustee of the Zeitz Museum of Contemporary Art Africa, the first major museum in Africa dedicated to contemporary art. Furthermore, he is a member of the Advisory Board of Full Frame Documentary Film Festival, and of the board of the Tribeca Film Institute.

He splits his time between upstate New York and Amsterdam, The Netherlands.

Filmography

Director 
1997: Discovered At Sundance (TV)
2000: Reagan: A Life In Pictures (TV)
2001: Time (TV)
2001: Challenge America With Erin Brockovich (TV)
2002: Secret Son (TV)
2003: Power, Privilege & Justice (TV)
2003: Boys Will Be Girls (TV)
2003: First Off The Tee (TV)
2003: New York Underground (TV)
2004: The Lives They Lived (TV)
2004: Moroccan Style (TV)
2005: Sheila Bridges Designer Living: Morocco Special (TV) and Sheila Bridges Designer Living
2006: Amazing Families (TV)
2010: Undercover Boss (TV, 1 episode: 7-Eleven)
2010: Music by Prudence
2013: God Loves Uganda
2014: Tutu: The Essence of Being Human
2015: Gospel of Intolerance
2015: Blackface
2016: Life, Animated
2018: American Jail
2019: The Apollo
2023: Cassandro
2023: Love to Love You, Donna Summer

Producer 
1995: People Yearbook '95 (TV) (segment producer)
1996: Sex, Drugs and Consequences (TV) (producer)
1997: TV Nation: Volume One (segment producer)
2000: Reagan: A Life In Pictures (TV) (producer)
2001: Time (TV) (producer)
2002: Secret Son (TV) (producer)
2002: Life 360 (segment producer) (1 episode:Telling the Children) (segment producer)
2003: Power, Privilege & Justice (TV) (producer)
2003: First Off The Tee (TV) (producer)
2003: New York Underground (TV) (producer)
2004: The Lives They Lived (TV) (producer)
2004: Moroccan Style (TV) (producer)
2004 - 2005: Sheila Bridges Designer Living (series supervising producer)
2006: Amazing Families (TV) (producer)
2007: Alone No Love (co-producer)
2007: Yearbook (TV) (series producer)
2010: Music by Prudence (producer)
2013: God Loves Uganda (producer)
2014: Tutu: The Essence of Being Human (producer)
2016: Life, Animated
2022: Master of Light

Screenwriter 
2000: Reagan: A Life In Pictures (TV)
2003: Power, Privilege & Justice (TV)
2003: First Off The Tee (TV) 
2003: New York Underground (TV)
2004: The Lives They Lived (TV)
2004: Moroccan Style (TV)
2005: Sheila Bridges Designer Living: Morocco Special (TV)
2006: Amazing Families (TV)

Awards 
 NAMIC Vision Award for the television special Moroccan Style
 The National Headliner for Best Human Interest Feature for his documentary New York Underground
 Academy Award for Best Documentary (Short Subject) for Music by Prudence in 2010.
 Inspiration Award, Full Frame Documentary Film Festival for God Loves Uganda
Best Feature Documentary, Ashland Independent Film Festival for God Loves Uganda
 Best Feature Documentary Dallas International Film Festival for God Loves Uganda
 Directing Award: U.S. Documentary Sundance Film Festival 2016 for "Life, Animated"

References

External links 
 

1962 births
Living people
African-American film directors
American documentary filmmakers
Directors of Best Documentary Short Subject Academy Award winners
Easton Area High School alumni
Film directors from Pennsylvania
Primetime Emmy Award winners
21st-century African-American people
20th-century African-American people